Nisak Puji Lestari (born 12 July 1997) is an Indonesian badminton player. She was part of Indonesia team that won a silver medal at the 2014 World Junior Championships and a bronze medal at the 2015 Asian Junior Championships.

Achievements

Islamic Solidarity Games 
Women's doubles

BWF International Challenge/Series 
Women's doubles

  BWF International Challenge tournament
  BWF International Series tournament

Performance timeline

Indonesian team 
 Junior level

References

External links 
 

1997 births
Living people
People from Boyolali Regency
Sportspeople from Central Java
Indonesian female badminton players
21st-century Indonesian women
20th-century Indonesian women